Hargest may refer to:

People
 Brandon Hargest, member of Jump5 (American Christian music group)
 Brigadier James Hargest CBE
 Brittany Hargest (born August 2, 1988, in Durham, North Carolina)
 George E. Hargest (1906–1983), philatelist of Florida

Other
Hargest, New Zealand, a suburb of Invercargill, New Zealand
 James Hargest College, a large school in the suburb